Francis Key Brooke (November 2, 1852 – October 22, 1918) was a missionary bishop of what is now the Episcopal Diocese of Oklahoma, serving from 1893 to 1918.

Early life and education
Brooke was born on November 2, 1852 in Gambier, Ohio, the son of the Reverend John Thomson Brooke and Louisa R. Hunter. He studied at Kenyon College and graduated with a Bachelor of Arts in 1874, and a Master of Arts in 1881. He was awarded a Doctor of Sacred Theology from Kansas Theological School in 1892, and a Doctor of Divinity from the University of the South in 1911, and another from Kenyon in 1912.

Ordained Ministry
Brooke was ordained deacon on November 21, 1875 in Christ Church, Cincinnati and then priest, on May 6, 1877 in Christ Church, Springfield, Ohio, on both occasions by Bishop Thomas Augustus Jaggar of Southern Ohio. He was rector of Grace Church in College Hill, Cincinnati from 1875 to 1877, and then rector of Christ Church in Portsmouth, Ohio between 1877 and 1880. Between 1880 and 1884 he served as rector of St James' Church in Piqua, Ohio, before becoming rector of Grace Church in Sandusky, Ohio. In 1886 he moved to St Peter’s Church in St. Louis, while in 1888 he became rector of Trinity Church in Atchison, Kansas, where he remained until 1893. He was also an honorary canon of Grace Cathedral in Topeka, Kansas.

Episcopacy
Brooke was elected by the General Convention to be the first Missionary Bishop of Oklahoma and was consecrated on January 6, 1893 in Grace Cathedral by Presiding Bishop Daniel S. Tuttle. In 1895, his title changed to Missionary Bishop of Oklahoma and Indian Territory. Brooke established Trinity Church in Guthrie, Oklahoma as his cathedral church until 1908, when he moved the diocesan headquarters to Oklahoma City and established St Paul's Cathedral. During his episcopacy the Missionary District of Oklahoma was divided in two, with the creation of the Missionary District of Eastern Oklahoma, which was reunited with the Missionary District of Oklahoma in 1919. Brooke died in office on October 22, 1918 in Chicago and was buried at Gambier, Ohio.

Family
Brooke had married Mildred R. Baldwin on January 5, 1881. They had one son who died in 1907. Mildred passed away in 1928.

References
 

1852 births
1918 deaths
19th-century American Episcopalians
Episcopal bishops of Oklahoma
Kenyon College alumni